MKX is a protein.

MKX may also refer to:

Lincoln MKX, an automobile
Jaguar Mark X, an automobile
Mortal Kombat X, a video game

See also
 Mark X (disambiguation) also covering Mark 10 (Mk10)
 mk10 (disambiguation)